Holidays in Europe (The Naughty Nought) is the second and last studio album by the Icelandic post-punk group Kukl, released on January 24, 1986, by Crass Records.

The album has been reissued numerous times: in 1997 by Crass Records, and in 2002, 2004 and 2008 by One Little Indian Records.

Production
The album was recorded at Southern Studios in London between October 1984 and October 1985 and was produced by Penny Rimbaud of Crass and engineered by Mel Jefferson. The album was more complex in comparison to its predecessor The Eye, with greater use of electronic noise and distorted samples and keyboards.

Track listing

Personnel 
Credits adapted from the album's liner notes.

Kukl
 Björk (credited as "Bjørk") – vocals
 Einar Örn Benediktsson (credited as "Einar Ørn") – vocals, trumpet
 Einar Arnaldur Melax (credited as "Melax") – synthesizer, piano
 Guðlaugur Kristinn Óttarsson (credited as "Gud Krist") – electric strings
 Birgir Mogensen (credited as "Birgir") – bass
 Sigtryggur Baldursson (credited as "Sigtryggur") – drums
Additional personnel
Penny Rimbaud – production
Mel Jefferson – engineering
Jamil Sairah – additional vocals (track 5)
Sjón (Sigurjón Birgir Sigurðsson) – participated in the booklet design, but the early work was subsequently replaced by Einar Ørn and Crass.

References

External links
Website about the history and discography of Kukl

1986 albums
Kukl (band) albums